Conus exiguus, common name Cabrit's cone, is a species of sea snail: a marine gastropod mollusk in the family Conidae, the cone snails and their allies.

Like all species within the genus Conus, these snails are predatory and venomous. They are capable of "stinging" humans, therefore live ones should be handled carefully or not at all.

Description
The size of the shell varies between 14 mm and 54 mm. The violaceous shell is more or less marbled with chestnut, and more or less granular on the body whorl. The convex spire convex is conical and tuberculated. The aperture is violaceous.

Distribution
This marine species occurs off New Caledonia, Samoa and Vietnam.

References

 Bernardi, A. B., 1859. Description d'espèces nouvelles de l'Archipel Calédonien. Journal de Conchyliologie 7: 377–378
 Röckel, D., Korn, W. & Kohn, A.J., 1995. Manual of the living Conidae. Volume 1: Indo-Pacific region. Hemmen: 517 pp
  Petit, R. E. (2009). George Brettingham Sowerby, I, II & III: their conchological publications and molluscan taxa. Zootaxa. 2189: 1–218
 Puillandre N., Duda T.F., Meyer C., Olivera B.M. & Bouchet P. (2015). One, four or 100 genera? A new classification of the cone snails. Journal of Molluscan Studies. 81: 1–23

Gallery
Below are several color forms:

External links
 The Conus Biodiversity website
 Cone Shells – Knights of the Sea
 
 Holotype in MNHN, Paris

exiguus
Gastropods described in 1810